The 1983 All-Pacific Coast men's basketball team consists of men's basketball players chosen by various organizations for the All-Pacific Coast teams in the 1982–83 NCAA Division I men's basketball season. Below are the UPI selections.

Selections

First team
 Leon Wood Fullerton State 6-3, 185, Junior
 Byron Scott Arizona State 6-5, 195, Junior
 Sidney Green UNLV 6-9, 220, Senior
 Charlie Sitton Oregon State 6-8, 201, Junior
 Kenny Fields UCLA 6-7, 220, Junior

Second team
 Dane Suttle Pepperdine 6-3, 180, Senior
 Rod Foster UCLA 6-1, 152, Senior
 Michael Cage San Diego State 6-9, 225, Junior
 Steve Harriel Washington State 6-6, 215, Senior
 Chris McNealy San Jose State 6-7, Senior

Third team
 Danny Tarkanian UNLV 6-2, 185, Junior
 Billy Allen Nevada 6-1, 165, Senior
 Harold Keeling Santa Clara 6-3, 180, Sophomore
 Larry Anderson UNLV 6-6, 180, Senior
 Darren Daye UCLA 6-8, 220, Senior

Coach of the Year
 Jerry Tarkanian UNLV

Player of the Year 
 Kenny Fields UCLA

See also
 1983 NCAA Men's Basketball All-Americans

References

All
All-Pacific Coast men's basketball teams